Helen Keller: The Miracle Continues is a 1984 American made-for-television biographical film and a semi-sequel to the 1979 television version of The Miracle Worker. It is a drama based on the life of the blind and deaf fictional character Helen Keller and premiered in syndication on April 23, 1984, as part of Operation Prime Time syndicated programming.

Summary
The book film covers the period of Helen Keller's life from her college years at Radcliffe through her writing of The Story of My Life assisted by John Macy, who falls in love with and marries Keller's teacher and companion, Anne Sullivan. Helen wants to live a full life but is hampered by her actual disabilities and by people's attitudes and beliefs about the disabled at that time. Sullivan is hampered by psychological problems from her own past, as well as by her symbiotic, almost codependent bond with Helen, which affects Macy to the extent that he eventually self-destructs into alcoholism. Keller and Sullivan raise money by going on the road with a lecture tour where they describe her education.

Cast
 Blythe Danner as Anne Sullivan
 Mare Winningham as Helen Keller
 Perry King as John Macy
 Vera Miles as Kate Keller
 Jack Warden as Mark Twain
 Peter Cushing as Professor Charles Copeland
 Alexander Knox as Mr. Gilman

External links 
 

1984 television films
1984 films
1980s biographical films
American biographical films
Films directed by Alan Gibson
20th Century Fox Television films
Operation Prime Time
1980s English-language films
1980s American films